India and Romania maintain international relations.

Early history 

Romania and India were briefly connected by Alexander the Great's empire in 326 BC.

Direct contact between India and Romania dates back a few centuries.

Modern history 
Diplomatic relations between India and Romania were established on 14 December 1948 at the legacy level, and were upgraded to embassy level in 1957. Romania opened an embassy in New Delhi in 1955, and India opened an embassy in Bucharest in 1957. The Romanian Prime Minister   visited  India  in  March  1958.
Today, Romania also has honorary consulates in Chennai and Kolkata, and India has an honorary consulate in Timișoara.

Economic relations 
The Indian and Romaniam governments discussed the terms of a proposed a refinery project in Assam in mid-1958.

Bilateral trade between the two countries was US$727.27 million in 2011–12. India exported $269.54 million to, and imported  $457.73  million, worth of goods from Romania. Bilateral trade totaled $713 million in 2013.

Several Indian firms such as Ranbaxy, Gujarat Heavy Chemicals (GHCL), WIPRO, Genpact and Raymonds have a presence in Romania.

Indians in Romania

As of July 2013, around 950 Indian citizens resided in Romania.

See also 
 Foreign relations of India
 Foreign relations of Romania
 Ambassador of India to Romania

References

External links

 Embassy of Romania in New Delhi

 
Romania
Bilateral relations of Romania